Sam Witwer (born October 20, 1977) is an American actor. He is known for his roles as Crashdown in Battlestar Galactica, Davis Bloome in Smallville, Aidan Waite in Being Human, Mr. Hyde in Once Upon a Time, Ben Lockwood in Supergirl, and Rupert Chipping in Riverdale.

Witwer has worked on numerous projects in the Star Wars franchise, having first provided his voice and likeness for Starkiller in the Star Wars: The Force Unleashed video game series. He later notably voiced Darth Maul in the television series Star Wars: The Clone Wars and Star Wars Rebels, as well as the film Solo: A Star Wars Story. He has also voiced the Son and Emperor Palpatine in The Clone Wars and Rebels, respectively. Witwer portrayed protagonist Deacon St. John through motion capture for the video game Days Gone by Bend Studio.

Early life
Witwer was born on October 20, 1977, and grew up in Glenview, Illinois, a small suburb outside of Chicago. He attended Glenbrook South High School, during which time he was involved in drama and theater classes, as well as being the lead singer of a high school band called "Love Plumber". He attended the Juilliard School for a time before moving to Los Angeles.

Career

Witwer's first on-screen credit was that of a Chicago Bulls commercial. He soon found himself in speaking roles on hit television series, such as ER.

Witwer's first major recurring role came in the form of portraying raptor pilot 'Crashdown' (his call sign) on Battlestar Galactica, although he has credited much of his current success to his role as Neil Perry on the Showtime series Dexter. Witwer also appeared as Private Wayne Jessup in the film The Mist.

From 2008 to 2009, Witwer was cast in season 8 of Smallville as Davis Bloome, a charming paramedic who struggles with a darkness within as he is the human camouflage of Doomsday. Witwer played Davis while Doomsday was played by stuntman Dario Delacio. Witwer's performance in Smallville was incredibly well-received, and he has stated that his experience on the show had opened more opportunities for him in the future of acting. Witwer’s contract gave him the option to return in season 9 as Zod, though he ultimately declined. Though he considered his time on the show enjoyable and was flattered by the offer to stay on, he passed on the role as he felt it would be difficult for both the characters and audience to accept.

Witwer made a cameo appearance in The Walking Dead as a dead zombie soldier in a tank in the season 1 episode "Days Gone Bye" which reunited him with director Frank Darabont from The Mist. Coincidentally, in 2019 he went on to portray the main protagonist (both voice and motion capture) of a video game called Days Gone, which also tackles the topic of zombie apocalypse. 

From 2011 to 2014, Witwer starred in the North American remake of Being Human. He played the lead role of vampire Aidan Waite. The show, as well as his performance, was well received and lasted 4 seasons.

He voiced Ocean Master in the animated film Justice League: Throne of Atlantis for the DC Universe Animated Original Movies series, replacing fellow Star Wars actor Steve Blum from Justice League: War.

In 2016 Witwer played Edward Hyde on Once Upon a Time, recurring for part of its sixth season after debuting at the end of the fifth season.

In 2018, Witwer joined the main cast of The CW drama series Supergirl, portraying the fourth season's main antagonist Ben Lockwood / Agent Liberty.

Role-playing games
Sam is an avid player of both pen-and-paper and video role-playing games. This is a hobby that he has engaged in for years. He has been a frequent guest on the Podcast Order 66 and has expressed a love for all iterations of Star Wars role-playing games Star Wars: The Roleplaying Game (by West End Games) to Star Wars Roleplaying Game (by Wizards of the Coast) and to the series of cross-compatible Star Wars roleplaying games by Fantasy Flight Games.

Sam appeared in episode 19 of Geek and Sundry's Tabletop playing the Dragon Age role-playing game, and episodes 29 and 55 of Dice Camera Action as Mordenkainen.

In January 2017, he appeared as a guest on a play-through of ScratchPad Publishing's Dusk City Outlaws, alongside Elisa Teague, Tom Lommel, Spencer Crittenden, and game designer Rodney Thompson.

Star Wars
A lifelong Star Wars fan, Witwer provided both his voice and likeness for lead character Galen Marek / Starkiller (Darth Vader's secret apprentice) in the 2008 video game Star Wars: The Force Unleashed and 2010 sequel Star Wars: The Force Unleashed II. He also voiced Darth Sidious (Emperor Palpatine) in the first game, and reprised it for the games Disney Infinity 3.0 and Battlefront and for the original season 2 premiere of Star Wars Rebels; however, in 2019, the role was re-dubbed by Ian McDiarmid who portrayed Palpatine in the films and in Rebels season 4.

For Star Wars: The Clone Wars, Witwer had also vocally performed the Son in a three episode story arc (known as the Mortis trilogy) in season 3 as well as the iconic former Sith Maul in the season 4 finale episodes, four episodes of season 5, and the "Siege of Mandalore" arc in season 7. He also lent his voice for Maul in other projects such as the Star Wars: Episode I Brisk commercial as well as the Cartoon Network special Lego Star Wars: The Empire Strikes Out, and again for Star Wars Rebels. On September 27, 2012, a feature-length "director's cut" of Witwer's season 4 finale episodes of The Clone Wars were released as a direct-to-video film, Star Wars: The Clone Wars – Darth Maul Returns, initially made available exclusively at Target.

Witwer attended The Clone Wars season 5 Red Carpet Premiere in Orlando, Florida on August 24, 2012 during Celebration VI along with some of his co-stars Matt Lanter, James Arnold Taylor, Dee Bradley Baker, Tom Kane, Daniel Logan, Stephen Stanton and Ashley Eckstein, as well as Supervising Director Dave Filoni. During Celebration VI, he also had his own panel called: Sam Witwer "The Maul Within" on August 26, 2012. In 2013, he attended for the first time the annual event, Star Wars Weekends at Disney's Hollywood Studios in Orlando, Florida for a three-day weekend and fans praised him for his roles in The Force Unleashed games and on The Clone Wars. During the live show "Behind the Force", Sam showed his acting skills by saying one or two lines of the characters that he's played in the Star Wars universe.

Witwer has also voiced an alien as well as a First Order stormtrooper during the siege of Maz Kanata's palace in Star Wars: The Force Awakens.

In 2018, Witwer reprised his portrayal as Maul and performed the voice acting role for the character in Solo: A Star Wars Story, marking the sixth project for which Witwer voices Maul, and the first live-action performance.

In 2020, Witwer was cast as an unidentified dark side character in the StarWarsKids.com and YouTube game show Star Wars: Jedi Temple Challenge, which premiered on June 3, 2020.

Music career 
Witwer serves as the front-man for the band The Crashtones, whose first studio album Colorful of the Stereo was released February 15, 2006. Witwer released a new album May 7, 2019 entitled Revenge of the Crashtones.

Filmography

Film

Television

Video games

References

External links

 
 
 

1977 births
Living people
20th-century American male actors
21st-century American male actors
American male film actors
American male television actors
American male video game actors
American male voice actors
Juilliard School alumni
Male actors from Illinois
Male actors from Los Angeles
People from Glenview, Illinois